Back Breaker is the third album from American Christian metal band the Showdown. It is their first album with Solid State Records. On June 27, 2008, The Showdown released the track listing. On August 19, 2008, the album was released in stores. It is the last album to feature guitarist Travis Bailey, bassist Eric  Koruschak, and drummer AJ Barrette.

Style 
The style of Back Breaker has proved to be somewhat a mix of their first two albums. They have returned to the heavier sound of A Chorus of Obliteration, while still keeping some of the southern elements of Temptation Come My Way. Lead vocalist Dave Bunton uses harsh screaming, growling, and yelling often, but also mixes in some singing. The band characterized Temptation Come My Way as being their "Black Album.", while this album has moved towards their Pantera influences. Drummer A.J. Barrette brings back more double bass for this album. Each of the album's song titles is based on Greek mythology storylines.

The album cover was designed by Ryan Clark and features Mark Dugdale as its model.

Track listing 
 "Titanomachy - The Beginning" - 2:42
 "Hephaestus - The Hammer Of The Gods" – 4:18
 "Aphrodite - The Disillusionaire" - 4:14
 "Achilles - The Backbreaker" – 3:59
 "Prometheus - The Fires Of Deliverance" – 3:57
 "Cerberus - The Hellhound Awaits" 4:27
 "Odysseus - A Song of Hope" 3:57
 "Aries - I Am Vengeance" – 3:25
 "Infernus - You Will Move" - 4:00
 "Nemesis - Give Us This Day" 3:53
 "Medea - One Foot In Hell" - 5:12

Credits
The Showdown
 David Bunton – vocals
 Josh Childers – guitar
 A.J Barrette – drums
 Eric Koruschak – bass
 Travis Bailey – guitar

Production
 Jeremiah Scott – producer
 Ryan Clark – artwork
 Mark Dugdale – model for artwork
 Jon Dunn – A&R
 Troy Glessner – mastering
 J.R. McNeely – mixing
 Jerad Knudson – photography
 Chris Byrnes – assistant
 Justin Burns – editing

References 

The Showdown (band) albums
2008 albums
Solid State Records albums